Khowzineh-ye Bala (also Romanized as Khowzīneh-ye Bālā and Khvozīneh-ye Bālā; also known as Boneh-ye ‘Ābed‘own, Boneh-ye ‘Ābed‘ūn, Khowzīnā Bālā, and Khowzīn-e Bālā) is a village in Kheybar Rural District, Choghamish District, Dezful County, Khuzestan Province, Iran. At the 2006 census, its population was 415, in 65 families.

References 

Populated places in Dezful County